Two Italian painters, grandfather and grandson, are named Francesco Bassano:
 Francesco Bassano the Elder (c. 1475–1539), Italian painter
 Francesco Bassano the Younger (1549–1592), Italian painter